KTSJ (90.9 FM) was a radio station broadcasting a Christian contemporary format. Licensed to Menan, Idaho, United States, the station served the Idaho Falls area. The station was last owned by Hi-Line Radio Fellowship, Inc.

History
Originally owned by the Idaho Conference of Seventh-Day Adventists, the station was sold to Hi-Line Radio Fellowship in 2018 for $20,000.

The station was taken silent on November 1, 2018. The Federal Communications Commission cancelled KTSJ's license on October 4, 2021, due to the station failing to file an application to renew its license.

References

TSJ
Radio stations established in 2010
Radio stations disestablished in 2021
2010 establishments in Idaho
2021 disestablishments in Idaho
Defunct radio stations in the United States
Defunct religious radio stations in the United States
TSJ